Stinkfist is a collaborative EP by Clint Ruin (a.k.a. J. G. Thirlwell) and Lydia Lunch. This outing from the ex-Immaculate Consumptive bandmates was originally released as a 12" in 1987 on Lunch's Widowspeak label.

Content 
The album cover shows Lunch and Ruin—lovers at the time—in a coital embrace.

Release 
Stinkfist was released in 1987 by record label Widowspeak. A 1989 CD version added "The Crumb", a single by Lunch and Sonic Youth leader Thurston Moore.

Reception 
Trouser Press wrote "Stinkfist could be the first joint effort [Lydia Lunch] doesn't dominate [...] Lots of noise and energy but nothing new, especially for the already Foetusized."

Track listing

Personnel and production
"Stinkfist" and "Son of Stink":
Cliff Martinez – drums, metal
DJ Bonebrake – drums, metal
Neil – drums, metal
Spit – drums, metal
Tom Surgal – metal
Roli Mosimann – timbales, engineering
Lydia Lunch – voices, metal
Clint Ruin – voices, metal
Randy Burns – engineering
Hahn Rowe – engineering
"Meltdown Oratorio":
Lydia Lunch – voices
Clint Ruin – instruments
Martin Bisi – engineering
"The Crumb":
Thurston Moore – guitars, voice
Lydia Lunch – voice
Clint Ruin – loops, treatments, production
Bass/drums - "grafted and transplanted from eternity." Bass and drums are reworked from Lydia Lunch's "Dead in the Head" on her Honeymoon in Red album.  Though uncredited, the original performance is by Ruin.
Martin Bisi – engineering

Charts

References

External links 
 
 Stinkfist at foetus.org

1987 EPs
JG Thirlwell albums
Lydia Lunch albums
Collaborative albums